Jason Glenn Roach (born April 20, 1976) is a former Major League Baseball starting pitcher. He batted and threw right-handed.

Roach was drafted by the New York Mets in the 20th round of the 1997 amateur draft. He had a 0-2 record in 2 games, with a 12.00 ERA.

Singles in his only two at-bats left Roach with a rare MLB career batting average of 1.000.

External links
, or Baseball Almanac, or Retrosheet, or Pelota Binaria (Venezuelan Winter League)

1976 births
Living people
Altoona Curve players
Baseball players from North Carolina
Binghamton Mets players
Capital City Bombers players
Durham Bulls players
Indianapolis Indians players
Major League Baseball pitchers
Navegantes del Magallanes players
American expatriate baseball players in Venezuela
New York Mets players
Norfolk Tides players
People from Kinston, North Carolina
Pittsfield Mets players
St. Lucie Mets players
UNC Wilmington Seahawks baseball players